Bidrohi is an 2022 Bangladeshi action drama film. The film is directed by Shaheen Sumon and is produced by Selim Khan under the banner of Shapla Media. The film is written by Delwar Hossain Dil. It feature Shakib Khan, Shabnom Bubly and Sushmita Mridula in the lead roles, and Misha Sawdagor, Amit Hasan, Shiba Shanu, Don, Sadek Bachchu,  and Saberi Alam have played supporting roles in film. But the COVID-19 situation delayed the releasing date. Shahin Sumon, director of this film, thinking of releasing the film on an online streaming app. Finally it released on 3 May 2022 in 102 cinemas in Bangladesh.

Cast 
 Shakib Khan as Mirza Nafis Iqbal Surjo
 Shabnom Bubly
 Sushmita Mridula as Maya
 Sadek Bachchu
 Misha Sawdagor
 Saberi Alam
 Amit Hasan
 Shiba Shanu
 Bipasha Kabir - Item number

References

External links 
 

Bengali-language Bangladeshi films
Bangladeshi action drama films
2020s Bengali-language films
Films scored by Akassh
Films scored by Shree Pritam
Films postponed due to the COVID-19 pandemic